Zihar or Thihar is a term used in Islamic Jurisprudence, which literally connotes an admonition by Allah to the believers. In Islam, Thihar, is when a husband is referring to his wife as his mother or by uttering that,  “you are, to me, like my mother” and vice-versa.  It is a form of divorce (it is though invalid) and if a husband says these words to his wife, it is highly unlawful for him to have sexual intercourse with her unless he recompense by freeing a slave, fasting for two successive months, or feeding sixty poor people.

Background 

Zihar was accepted as a declaration of divorce among pre-Islamic Arabs and it is mentioned in the Quran in reference to Khawla bint Tha'labah, who was divorced by this formula in the chapter 58, verses 1-4:

Legality 

Zihar is illegal and considered an insult in the Islamic law. It implies that the man, declaring his wife akin to his mother, is guilty of the sin of forbidding the lawful things. It has been proscribed by law and the act does not ensue in divorce. It is condemned in the law. Thus, penalties in the form of setting free a slave, fasting, or feeding the poor have been imposed for it.

References 

Islamic terminology
Islamic jurisprudence
Arabic words and phrases in Sharia
Divorce in Islam